Dennis Brock (born 27 February 1995) is a German footballer who plays as a midfielder for 1. FC Düren.

References

External links
 

Living people
1995 births
Footballers from Cologne
German footballers
Association football midfielders
FC Viktoria Köln players
Sportfreunde Lotte players
Bonner SC players
SC Fortuna Köln players
Regionalliga players
3. Liga players
Oberliga (football) players